Major Eric Stuart Dougall VC MC (13 April 1886 – 14 April 1918) was an English recipient of the Victoria Cross, the highest and most prestigious award for gallantry in the face of the enemy that can be awarded to British and Commonwealth forces.

Dougall was born in Tunbridge Wells on 13 April 1886 to Andrew and Emily Elizabeth Dougall. He was educated at Tonbridge School, where he won the Cras, the school's cross country race.
When he won his VC he was 31 years old, and an Acting Captain in the Special Reserve, Royal Field Artillery, attached to A Bty., 88th Brigade. He was awarded the Victoria Cross for his deeds on 10 April 1918 at Messines, Belgium.

He was killed in action at Kemmel, Belgium on 14 April 1918. His VC is owned by Pembroke College, Cambridge.

Prior to his war service, Dougall was an Assistant Engineer at the Bombay Port Trust, and there is an officers' residence building named after him (called Dougall House) there.

References

Monuments to Courage (David Harvey, 1999)
The Register of the Victoria Cross (This England, 1997)
VCs of the First World War - Spring Offensive 1918 (Gerald Gliddon, 1997)

External links

1886 births
1918 deaths
Burials in Belgium
British World War I recipients of the Victoria Cross
Recipients of the Military Cross
Royal Field Artillery officers
British Army personnel of World War I
British military personnel killed in World War I
People from Royal Tunbridge Wells
People educated at Tonbridge School
Alumni of Pembroke College, Cambridge
British Army recipients of the Victoria Cross
Military personnel from Kent